The Battle of Pumpkin Creek, also known as the Volborg fight, was fought February 7–8, 1880, by United States Soldiers, and Scouts, against Sioux warriors. The Battle occurred near Pumpkin Creek, a tributary of Toungue River, in Montana Territory, in present-day Montana, United States.

Background 
Early in 1880, the Lakota began warring along the Yellowstone River near Fort Keogh. On February 3, Hunkpapa Lakota fought with Gros Ventres, and 15 Lakota Sioux attacked three hay cutters on the Powder River, killing one, and mortally wounding another. The surviving worker reported the incident to Fort Keogh, and Sergeant Thaddeus B. Glover, Corporal Edwards, Private Charles W. Gurnsey, Private George E. Douglass, and four other soldiers of Company B, 2nd United States Cavalry Regiment, and seven Indian scouts were ordered out on February 5, in search of the Lakota responsible.

The battle
The temperature read 56 degrees Fahrenheit below zero. The soldiers and scouts quietly surrounded the warriors who were in a rock formation. Private George E. Douglass exposed himself too far over the edge of a ridge and was immediately spotted by a warrior who fired, killing him instantly. Both sides then fired shots at each other, and one Sioux warrior was killed, and two were wounded. Private Charles W. Gurnsey of Glover's detachment was wounded. The engagement was decided when Company F, of the 5th United States Infantry Regiment under the command of Captain Simon Snyder arrived the next morning from Fort Keogh. With the now much larger force of over sixty United States soldiers, the four remaining Lakota warriors surrendered. The action as recalled by Sergeant Glover:

Medal of honor 
One Congressional Medal of Honor was awarded for actions during the battle. It was for:
 Sergeant Thaddeus B. Glover, Company B, 2nd United States Cavalry Regiment.

The battlefield 
The Pumpkin Creek Battlefield is at an unknown location near Pumpkin Creek in Powder River County, Montana, or Custer County, Montana. The nearest present-day unincorporated community to the battlefield is Volborg, Montana, and the nearest present-day towns are Broadus, Montana, and Miles City, Montana.

Order of battle
United States Army, Sergeant Thaddeus Brown Glover, Captain Simon Snyder, commanding.
 2nd United States Cavalry Regiment, Companies B and E (Detachment: 8 men) 
 Sergeant Thaddeus Brown Glover
 Corporal Edwards
 Private George E. Douglass (killed in action)
 Private Charles W. Gurnsey (severely wounded)
 Four unidentified soldiers
 5th United States Infantry Regiment, Company F, Captain Simon Snyder.
 7 Indian scouts

Native Americans
 6 Lakota Sioux warriors.

References 

Indian wars of the American Old West
1880 in the United States
Montana Territory
Battles involving the Sioux
February 1880 events
Native American history of Montana